Vikestad is a surname. Notable people with the surname include:

Robert Vikestad (born 1983), Norwegian footballer
Runa Vikestad (born 1984), Norwegian footballer